Sarcophaga compactilobata is a species of fly in the family Sarcophagidae.

References

Sarcophagidae
Insects described in 1991
Muscomorph flies of Europe